Henry Malcolm McHenry (born May 19, 1944) is a professor of anthropology at the University of California, Davis, specializing in studies of human evolution, the origins of bipedality, and paleoanthropology.

McHenry has published on the comparative relationships among primate fossils.  His findings have been featured in scholarly journals, and in publications including Science, The New York Times, Discover and National Geographic.  McHenry earned bachelor's and master's degrees at UC Davis before earning his Ph.D. at Harvard.

Efficient Walker theory
Attempting to explain the evolutionary advent of bipedalism among hominids, McHenry and Peter Rodman have advanced the Efficient Walker theory, based on energetic analysis. The scientists compared the efficiency of chimpanzees walking on two versus four legs, finding two legged locomotion was far more efficient.  They concluded bipedalism was selected simply because it allowed for a further range of travel for hominids.  As Miocene forests decreased and hominids were forced into the savannas, the scientists reason, bipedalism enabled greater access to resources.

Study of African ancestors
McHenry travels regularly to Africa to extend his knowledge of human origins, focusing his studies on the fossil remains of australopithecines.  The best-known of which are the 3.2-million-year-old remains of 'Lucy', discovered in 1974 by Donald Johanson of the Institute for Human Origins.  According to McHenry,  "The earlier species (Lucy) is more primitive in its skull and teeth, but has human-like body proportions," whereas "the later species, africanus, with more human-like skull and teeth, has the more ape-like body proportions--big arms, small legs."

Publications
McHenry has produced over 130 publications, comprising papers, reviews, and contributions to books.

Papers
Among the papers which McHenry has written or contributed to are the following:

Books
Among the books which McHenry has written or contributed to are the following: 

 Book review

References

External links
 UCDavis.edu - Henry McHenry's UC Davis homepage
 UCDavis.edu - 'Origin of Bipedality', McHenry, H.M., Annual Review of Anthropology, vol 11, p 151-173 (1982)
 UCDavis.edu - 'Henry McHenry honored for highly evolved teaching', Lisa Klionsky (March 3, 2000)
 UCDavis.edu - 'The singing paleontologist: Back from his latest African visit, Henry McHenry has a bone to pick with an old theory about human evolution', Trina Wood

1944 births
Living people
American anthropologists
Primatologists
Harvard University alumni
University of California, Davis faculty
University of California, Davis alumni
Paleoanthropologists